Montgomery refers to:

People
For people with the name Montgomery, see Montgomery (name)

Places

Belgium
 Montgomery Square, Brussels
 Montgomery metro station, Brussels

Pakistan
 Montgomery (town), British India, former name of Sahiwal, Punjab
 Montgomery District, an administrative district in the Lahore division of former Punjab Province of British India
 Montgomery Tahsil, an administrative subdivision of Montgomery District in Punjab province of British India

United Kingdom

Wales
 Montgomery, Powys
 Montgomery Canal
 Montgomery Castle
 Montgomeryshire (disambiguation)

United States
 Montgomery, Alabama, state capital
 Montgomery, California
 Montgomery, Georgia
 Montgomery, Illinois
 Montgomery, Indiana
 Montgomery, Iowa
 Montgomery, Kentucky
 Montgomery, Louisiana
 Montgomery, Massachusetts
 Montgomery, Michigan
 Montgomery, Minnesota
 Montgomery, Mississippi
 Montgomery, New York (disambiguation)
 Montgomery, Ohio
 Montgomery, Pennsylvania
 Montgomery, Tennessee
 Montgomery, Texas
 Montgomery, Vermont
 Montgomery, West Virginia
 Montgomery City, Missouri
 Montgomery Creek, California
 Montgomery Field, an airport in San Diego, California
 Montgomery Reservoir, Colorado
 Montgomery Village, Maryland
 Montgomery County (disambiguation)
 Montgomery Street (disambiguation)
 Montgomery Township (disambiguation)
 Montgomeryville (disambiguation)

Other countries
 Montgomery Rocks, Tasmania, Australia
 Electoral division of Montgomery, Tasmania, Australia
 Montgomery, Calgary, a neighbourhood in Calgary, Alberta, Canada

Organizations
 Montgomery College, one of Maryland's community colleges
 Montgomery Elevator, a defunct elevator company acquired by KONE
 Montgomery Guards, an Irish-American militia unit
 Montgomery Motorcycles, a now defunct British motorcycle manufacturer
 Montgomery Ward, an American department store chain
 Richard Montgomery High School, Rockville, Maryland

Ships
 USS Montgomery, several US Navy ships
 USS Montgomery County (LST-1041), a US Navy Landing Ship, Tank
 SS Richard Montgomery, a US World War II Liberty Ship that eventually sank in the Thames Estuary, UK

Other uses
 Clan Montgomery, a Scottish clan
 Glands of Montgomery, sebaceous glands in the areola, named for Dr. William Fetherstone Montgomery
 Montgomery cocktail, a Martini mixed at a gin:vermouth ratio of 15:1
 Montgomery modular multiplication, a method for multiplying large integers in modulo field
 The Montgomery (disambiguation), several buildings

See also
 Montgomery Academy (disambiguation)
 Montgomery Square (disambiguation)
 Justice Montgomery (disambiguation)
 Sainte-Foy-de-Montgommery, a commune in département Calvados, Normandy
 Saint-Germain-de-Montgommery, a commune in département Calvados, Normandy
 Colleville-Montgomery, a commune in département Calvados, Normandy